Rhimphalea circotoma is a moth in the family Crambidae. It was described by Edward Meyrick in 1889. It is found on New Guinea.

References

Spilomelinae
Moths described in 1889